Edwin Smith (also known as Ted; 17 September 1922 – 15 January 1997) was a New Zealand rower from Auckland.

Early life
Smith was born in Auckland, New Zealand, on 17 September 1922. He went to Rose Road Primary School in Grey Lynn and later Richmond Road School. He entered into a four and a half year Contract of Apprenticeship on 20 April 1938 as an Apprentice Fitter and Turner with Hubert Samual Tanner, New North Road, Auckland, Trailer Manufacture.

In his youth he sailed Huia a mullet boat with the Thomson brothers as far north as the Bay of Islands, prior to and after the war he sailed with Ken Brown on Ghost a Bermudian sloop-rigged 28 foot yacht designed and built by Woollacott. Ted later sailed with D'Arcy Whiting.

Military service 

Sergeant Edwin Smith (No 632850) served with the New Zealand 24th Battalion in Italy and Egypt.

On 28 November 1938 at the age of 16 years 2 months, he attested for service in New Zealand in the Territorials and was given regimental number 4905. He had previously spent one year with the S.M.T.C Cadets. He was posted to the A Company, 1st Auckland Battalion on 7 February 1939 as a private.

He attested for service again on 14 June 1940 and entered training camp on 1 July.  He attested for temporary service again on 8 August 1941, was given regimental number 5/1/1612 and posted to Instructor Area 3 – Whangarei.

He was promoted to Sergeant 16 January 1942 and served in New Zealand until 10 May 1943 when he was given indefinite leave without pay.

He attested for service in Time of War, Within and Beyond New Zealand in December 1943 and was given Army Service Number 632852. By this stage, he had spent five years in the Territorials, mainly serving at Narrow Neck Training Camp, Auckland.
 
He was called up with the 12th Reinforcements as a Private on 20 April 1944 and became an instructor in C Company at the Papakura training camp where his nickname was "Smicko". He was promoted to Sergeant on 28 June 1944 and embarked from Wellington on board the Highland Princess for Egypt on 29 June 1944. After arrival in the Middle East on 8 August 1944, further training occurred at Maadi Camp near Cairo. While in the Mediterranean he grew a moustache.

He was shipped from Alexandria to Taranto in Italy. On 24 December 1944, he became an Intelligence Sergeant for Major Ray Boord and reverted to the ranks on 29 March 1945 at his own request.

He eventually reached Trieste for rest and recreation at the end of the war in Europe, 8 May 1945. In July 1945 he was shipped back to Egypt to do training and instruction. From 10 to 24 October 1945 he got a leave pass for a trip to Baghdad, via Syria and Lebanon.

While based at Maadi Camp in Egypt, he competed in regattas on the Nile against local Egyptian rowing clubs. He was part of the winning crew of the Open Fours at a regatta hosted by the Cairo River Club on 9 December 1945.
He returned to New Zealand on the Orion, boarding at Port Said on 14 January 1946 and arriving in New Zealand 10 February 1946. He was discharged from the NZ Army on 14 May 1946.

War medals in recognition of service: 1939–45 Star, Italy Star, War Medal 1939-45, New Zealand War Service Medal.

Rowing in New Zealand 
He became a member of the West End Rowing Club, joining the December 1948 eight crew as bow. In 1949 this crew became Red Coats by winning the New Zealand Premier Eight Championships at Karapiro.
 
The crew became the New Zealand Empire Games Eight and underwent strenuous training on the Waikato River at Mercer and Ngāruawāhia and on lake Karapiro. The boat to be used at the Empire Games was the tried and true Charles G. Herdman, a one piece Towns Skiff owned by West End Rowing Club. New Ayling oars with larger "spoons" were acquired.

At the 1950 British Empire Games he won a silver medal rowing in the bow as part of the men's eight alongside crew members Donald Adam, Kerry Ashby, Murray Ashby, Bruce Culpan, Thomas Engel, Grahame Jarratt, Don Rowlands and Bill Tinnock.

He later served as a coach for West End Rowing Club, on the club's executive committee and as a starter for rowing regattas. In honour of his services he became an elected honorary member of the rowing club and later a vice-president.

General 

On 9 March 1948 at the age of 24 Ted married Lois Margaret Rutledge the 21-year-old daughter of Donald Rutledge and May Rutledge (née Gatland) at St Peters, Grey Lynn, Auckland. The wedding reception was at the Grey Lynn Returned Services Club hall, Francis Street, Auckland.

He built his first house in Rose Road, Grey Lynn. For a few years in the '60s he played football for Metro Soccer Club

He was a Sheetmetal Worker by trade and ran his own business, Broadway Sheetmetals Limited based in Patiki Road, Avondale specialising in dust extraction and heating & ventilation. He was admitted as an Associate Member of The New Zealand Institute of Heating & Ventilating Engineers on 11 July 1973. He sold Broadway Sheetmetals Ltd to Chenery Holdings Ltd in 1981.

He built a batch at Mangawhai Heads. He was Club Captain and a foundation member of the Mangawhai Surf Life Saving Club.

He later sold the batch at Mangawhai and acquired "Tijuana" a 32-foot yacht (Catharine Anne – Woollacott design) which he berthed at Westhaven Marina.  In his 50s Ted crewed on the "Red Feather" in a yacht race to Suva, Fiji and on the "Shenandoah" to New Caledonia.
In his retirement he grew orchards and made copper-work goods for friends and family.

Edwin (Ted) Smith died in the North Shore Public Hospital in Takapuna on 15 January 1997 at an age of 74.

The Voyager New Zealand Maritime Museum located on the Auckland waterfront has an exhibition called "The Immigrants". This exhibition re-lives the stories of immigrants to New Zealand from the 1950s through to the 1960s, as they leave their homes, families, and possession for a life on the other side of the world. In this exhibition there are feature walls and artefact display cases showing the life of Ted Smith's father Edwin Henry Mason Smith – Jeweller.

References

External links
Voyager New Zealand Maritime Museum

1922 births
1997 deaths
New Zealand male rowers
Rowers at the 1950 British Empire Games
Commonwealth Games silver medallists for New Zealand
New Zealand military personnel of World War II
Commonwealth Games medallists in rowing
Rowers from Auckland
Medallists at the 1950 British Empire Games